Paul Goldberg is a geologist specializing in geomorphology and geoarchaeology who had done extensive worldwide field researches.

Education

Paul Goldberg studied geology at the University of Colorado where he obtained his bachelor's degree in 1965. He continued his study of geology at the University of Michigan in 1968 where he graduated with a Masters in Science. He completed his Ph.D. in geology at University of Michigan in 1973. His Doctorate study focused on Sedimentology, Stratigraphy and Paleoclimatology from et-Tabun Cave, Mount Carmel, Israel. His Ph.D. advisor was Professor William R. Farrand, also a geologist. His mentor in archaeology was Professor Henry Wright at Michigan University.

Academic experience

Goldberg began his academic teaching career in 1972 as a lecturer in Earth Science at Kingsborough Community College. From 1973-1975 Goldberg was a Lady Davis Postdoctoral Fellow at the Institute of Archaeology at Hebrew University in Jerusalem. From 1984-1992 he was an associate professor at the Institute of Archaeology, Hebrew University. During the spring of 1985, he was a visiting professor in Anthropology / Sociology at the University of British Columbia. From 1989-1990 Goldberg was a visiting scholar in the Anthropology department at Harvard University. From 1989-1993 he was a research associate in Department of Archaeology at Boston University. He was later a research associate in the Peabody Museum of Harvard University (1991-2000). Goldberg became a research fellow at the Texas Archaeological Research Laboratory at University of Texas at Austin. He also taught geography at the University of Texas at Austin. He continued teaching as an associate professor in archaeology at Boston University from 1995 to 2001. In January 2006 Goldberg was an Invited Professor in the Laboratoire d' Anthropologie-Archeometrie at Universite de Rennes in France. Presently he is a Professor of Archaeology at Boston University specializing in the field of micromorphology with an emphasis on archaeological locations. Goldberg writes as a co-editor in the journal Geoarchaeology along with Rolfe Mandel from the Kansas Geological Survey. He is currently involved in passion projects that focus on geological archaeology, site formation processes and micromorphology of sediments focusing on archaeological locations.

Field researcher

Goldberg has undertaken fieldwork all over the world. His field researching has taken him to over 50 micromorphology locations around the world. In the summer of 1966 he did fieldwork in the Rhine Valley, France, researching loess as a field assistant to W. R. Farrand. During the summers of 1967 to 1970 he worked with A. J. Jelinek, a director working on stratigraphy and sedimentology in cave deposits with University of Michigan and Arizona Tabun Cave dig. In the summer of 1978 Goldberg, worked with director Y. Shiloh at the City of David dig in Jerusalem focusing on geology of Hellenistic sediments. In May 1980 Goldberg and director M.A.J. Williams researched micromorphology of sediments at Shaw's Creek Rockshelter in Australia. From 1989 to 1998 Goldberg did field research with R. I. Macphail at Gorham's Cave dig at Gibraltar with director C. Stringer. The focus on the work was on sedimentology, stratigraphy also palaeoenvironments associated with cave components. From 1991 and 1994 and then 1997 to 1999 Goldberg worked with B. Driskell, an expert on sedimentology with microstratigraphy. The focus was the site formation processes in Dust Cave, Alabama. From 1992 to 1995 Goldberg did field research with directors F. Grine and R. Klein in the area of geology, with a focus on micromorphology and stratigraphy in the Die Kelders Cave in South Africa. From 1992 to 1996 Goldberg and director I. Yalcinkaya focused on the micromorphology and sedimentology of cave components from a dig in Karain and the Okuzini Caves in Turkey. From May 1996 to 1997, Goldberg worked with O. Bar-Yosef and Steve Weiner in studying the micromorphology of the sediments from the Zhoukoudian Cave in China. From August 1999 to 2002 Goldberg and director N. Conrad worked on microstratigraphy and micromorphology in the Upper Palaeolithic Hohle Fels and the Geissenklösterle Caves in Germany. In January 1980 Goldberg and SUNY-Stony Brook graduate student, Jenna Cole, conducted research on the micromorphology and microstratigraphy from the Middle Stone Age in the Blombos Cave in South Africa with the director, Dr. C. Henshilwood. In August 2001, Goldberg studied with D. Adler and O. Bar-Yosef on geoarchaeology during the Palaeolithic era and attended digs in the Republic of Georgia at Ortvale Klade, Dzudzuana. In November 2005, O. Bar-Yosef and S. Weiner worked on the dig of microstratigraphy of the Early Neolithic Era at Yuchanyan, Hunan Province in China. In August 2006, Goldberg and director Enrique Baquedano collected micromorphological components during a Middle Palaeolithic dig at Pinilla del Valle in Spain.

Editorial and other activities
Goldberg is an Associate editor of journal, Geoarchaeology, Editorial Board Member of French Archaeology journal, Palaeo, Editorial Board Member of French Archaeology journal, Paléorient, Editorial Board Member of Eurasian Prehistory, headlined from Jagellonian University with American School of prehistoric Research at Harvard University. Goldberg produced an International Workshop of Soil Micromorphology at Boston University Sargent Camp in October 2003. That same year, Goldberg was a Vice-Chair for Archaeological Geology Division for Geological Society of America. He worked with O. Bar-Yosef on the Symposium on Site-Formation Processes for Society for American Archaeology Meeting in New Orleans, Louisiana during April 1991. Goldberg was preceding Vice-President of Sub-Commission B for International Union of Soil Sciences with Micromorphology. He was a previous Guest Editor along with Z.B. Begin for Israel Journal of Earth Sciences along with a Special Issue of INQUA (August 1987). He was also a Member of the Soil Micromorphology Committee (S884) for the Soil Science Society of America and a Partaker with INQUA of Holocene of the Circum-Mediterranean Area. His membership involves many other organizations such as American Quaternary Association, American Association for the Advancement of Science, Geological Society of America, International Association of Sedimentologists, Society for Sedimentary Geology, Society of Sigma Xi, Society of American Archaeology, Society for Archaeological Sciences and Palaeoanthropology Society.

References

Boston University Biography - Paul Goldberg, Professor Emeritus of Geoarchaeology and Archaeology
Doctorate: Goldberg, P. 1973. Sedimentology, Stratigraphy and Paleoclimatology of et-Tabum Cave, Mount Carmel, Israel. University Microfilms, Ann Arbor, Michigan.

Further reading

Books:
Goldberg, P. and R.I. Macphail, 2006. Practical and Theoretical Geoarchaeology. Blackwell Publishing, Oxford.
Courty, M.A., P. Goldberg and R. I. Macphail, 1989. Soil Micromorphology and Archaeology. Cambridge University Press.

Articles:
Goldberg, P., in press. Micromorphology and site formation at GeiBenklosterle Cave, Germany. In: N.J. Conrad and S. Munzel (Eds) GeiBenklosterle II: Naturwissenschaftliche Analysen. Thesis Verlag: Stuttgart.
Weiner, Steve, Qinqi Xu, Paul Goldberg, Jinyi Liu and Ofer Bar-Yosef, 1998. Evidence for the use of fire at Zhoukoudian China. Science, 281: 251-253. Reprinted in the Human Evolution Source Book, 2nd edition, (Ed R. L. Ciochon and J.G. Fleage), 2006, pp. 345–347, Pearson-Prentice Hall, NJ.

Year of birth missing (living people)
Living people
American geologists
University of Colorado alumni
University of Michigan alumni